Jack C. Jackson Jr. (Navajo) is an American attorney and politician from Arizona. A Democrat, he served in the Arizona Senate, representing the state's 2nd district in northern Arizona from 2011 until July 2013 when he left for an appointment with the U.S. Department of State.  He is a former member of the Arizona House of Representatives, having served from January 2003 to January 2005.

His father, Jack C. Jackson Sr., served in the Arizona House until 2004, and they were the first father and son to serve together in the state legislature. In 2004, Jackson Jr. declined to seek a second House term.

Personal life and education

Jack C. Jackson Jr. was born on the Navajo Nation, from his mother's Tó’áhaní (Near The Water) clan, and born for the clan of his father, Jack Jackson Sr., of the Kinyaa’áanii (Towering House) clan. His maternal grandfather is from the Tábaahá (Water’s Edge) clan, and his paternal grandfather is from the Áshiihí (Salt) clan. His father had a long political career, serving in the State Legislature from 1985 to 2004.

Jackson Jr. graduated from college, and attended law school at Syracuse University in New York, earning his J.D. degree in 1989. Eager to pursue a political career as his father was doing, he decided to start learning in Washington, D.C.

Political career
Jackson moved to the capital, where he started by representing tribal governments and organizations to the federal government. Beginning as a Legislative Associate, he advanced to Deputy Director for the Navajo Nation Washington Office. Jackson also worked as the Legislative Analyst at the National Indian Education Association, and the Director of Governmental Affairs for the National Congress of American Indians. In total, he worked in Washington for 12 years. In April 2000, Jackson was appointed by Donna Shalala, Secretary of Health and Human Services, to serve on President Bill Clinton’s Advisory Council on HIV/AIDS.

In 2002 Jackson Jr. ran for the Arizona State House and won. He served one term, from January 2003 to January 2005.

His father, Jack C. Jackson Sr., served in the Arizona State Legislature for more than 15 years, to 2004. The two were the first father and son to serve together in the Arizona legislature.

In 2005, Jackson announced a run for the U.S. House of Representatives in Arizona's 1st congressional district. The seat was held by the Republican Rick Renzi. That year, Jackson Jr. was appointed by Arizona Governor Janet Napolitano as the Executive Director of the Arizona Commission of Indian Affairs. Jackson withdrew from the House campaign before the Democratic primary in September 2006, and Renzi went on to retain his seat.

In 2010, Jackson Jr. ran for the Arizona Senate in the 2nd district and won the Democratic primary among three candidates held on August 24. Since no Republican filed for the seat, Jackson was unopposed in the general election. Since state redistricting in 2002, the district has contained part of the city of Flagstaff as well as the large Navajo Nation, and the Hopi, Havasupai, Hualapai and San Juan Southern Paiute tribes.

In the 2012 election, Jackson ran unopposed and was subsequently re-elected to the newly drawn Arizona Legislative District 7.

Jackson serves on the Navajo Nation Gaming Enterprise Board. The Obama Administration appointed him to serve on the President’s Advisory Council on HIV/AIDS. Jackson supports gay rights, introducing ill-fated legislation in 2013 to change Arizona's state Constitution which defined marriage as between one man and one woman.

Personal

Jackson is gay. On October 11, 2008, in Del Mar, California, before the passage of Proposition 8, Jackson was married to db Bailey in a sunset ceremony.

References

External links

21st-century American politicians
21st-century Native Americans
Arizona state senators
Gay politicians
LGBT Native Americans
LGBT state legislators in Arizona
Living people
Members of the Arizona House of Representatives
Native American state legislators in Arizona
Navajo people
People from Window Rock, Arizona
Syracuse University College of Law alumni
Year of birth missing (living people)